Old Iron is a 1938 British drama film directed by Tom Walls and starring Richard Ainley, Henry Hewitt, Eva Moore and Cecil Parker.

It was made at Shepperton Studios.

Cast
 Tom Walls as Sir Henry Woodstock 
 Eva Moore as Lady Woodstock 
 Cecil Parker as Barnett
 Richard Ainley as Harry Woodstock 
 David Tree as Michael 
 Veronica Rose as Lorna Barnett 
 Enid Stamp-Taylor as Eileen Penshaw 
 Leslie Perrins as Richard Penshaw 
 Arthur Wontner as Judge 
 Henry Hewitt as Wilfred 
 O. B. Clarence as Gordon

References

Bibliography
 Low, Rachael. Filmmaking in 1930s Britain. George Allen & Unwin, 1985.
 Wood, Linda. British Films, 1927-1939. British Film Institute, 1986.

External links

1938 films
1938 drama films
British drama films
Films set in England
Films shot at Shepperton Studios
Films directed by Tom Walls
British black-and-white films
1930s English-language films
1930s British films